Kasthamandap (Sanskrit: काष्ठमण्डप, Nepal Bhasa:मरु सत: Maru Satta:; literally "Wood-Covered Shelter") was a three-storied public shelter that included a shrine consecrated to Gorakshanath situated at Maru, Kathmandu, Nepal. Several myths and stories about the date of the construction of the Kasthamandap have been resolved with the recent archeological findings: newly discovered objects during the excavation in the aftermath of the 2015 earthquake have suggested that the Kasthamandap may have been built in the 7th century during the Lichhavi era.

2015 Nepal earthquake and subsequent excavations
A team of international and national experts from the Department of Archaeology (DoA), Government of Nepal and Durham University had excavated beneath the Kasthamandap and found coal and sand in the foundations. The foundation soil, coal, and sand were taken to the University of Stirling, Scotland for carbon and optically stimulated luminescence (OSL) tests. Nearly seven months of lab tests showed that the Kasthamandap was built in the 7th century, said Ram Kunwar, spokesperson at the Department of Archeology (DoA).

On 25 April 2015, Kasthamandap along with many others on the Kathmandu Durbar Square, was damaged and collapsed by the April 2015 Nepal earthquake, which had an estimated magnitude of 7.9.

During the excavations, copperplate inscriptions mentioning of Jayasthithi Malla, Jyotir Malla and Yogmati Bhattarika have been recovered from a pillar of the Kasthamandap. In the manuscripts dated Nepal Sambat 499, 454 and 543, (AD 1288, 1243, 1332) it is written that the person responsible for operating the Pachali Bhairav Jatra has to organise the festival following the specific regulations.

References

Second phase of work begins at Kasthamandap in Kathmandu - Durham University

External links

Hindu temples in Kathmandu District
Dharmshalas
7th-century establishments in Nepal
Newa architecture